Jon Mostad (born 21 April 1942) is a composer from Fredrikstad, Norway. He received the Norwegian state three-year scholarship for artists from 1982 until 1984.

Musical style
In his early compositions Mostad is moving from a linear-expressionist style to a more timbre-oriented line of thinking where both modernist and romantic music are inspiring his work. From around 1975 the timbre/harmonic aspect of his music becomes more related to the harmonic series. During the 1980s and 1990s he combines this with other types of modal and free compositional techniques, sometimes utilising modal techniques as well as more overtone-oriented harmonic spectra within the same composition.

At the same time he has also been experimenting with untraditional structuring of his material, both in works of one movement and in cyclical works. Many of Mostad's instrumental works as well as vocal music, are inspired by Judæo-Christian texts which often influence the structuring of the music. For instance in "And the light shines in darkness" a massive dark sounding layer with much rhythmical unrest gradually gets introduced to a lighter sounding chord with notes from the harmonic series.

Mostad has written chamber music, solo pieces for piano, guitar, organ and utilised electronics, both pre-recorded and live with interaction with live musicians, but his main focus has been orchestral and vocal music. His longest composition is the work "Were you there, when they crucified my Lord?" for choir, recitation, solo voices and orchestra.

Performances
The music of Jon Mostad has been played by leading orchestras in Norway (Oslo, Bergen, Trondheim...) as well as performed at Bergen International Festival, the Elverum Festival, Music Factory in Bergen and Dartington International Summer School in Totnes, England among other festivals. In 2010 he was featured composer of the Vinteriss festival in Østfold (a region in Norway). He has been represented at Nordic Music Days and has been played on radio in the Nordic countries, former Jugoslavia and England. His "2 psalms" for choir has been sung numerous times in Japan, England and Norway.

Mostad's music has also been performed by local amateur ensembles. Music ranging from small chamber pieces to the multimedia show Terje Vigen based on texts by Henrik Ibsen and theatrical music for Ibsen's Peer Gynt were written for local ensembles in Fredrikstad.

Mostad has also got commissions from Ny Musikk, NRK radio and TV, Ungdomssymfonikerne, Det Norske Blåseensemble, Amsterdams Gitaartrio and Oslo Sinfonietta as well as from local ensembles in Fredrikstad.

Mostad plays the piano, but has seldom been involved in performing his own music. Occasionally he has improvised pre- and postludes when substituting as organist in local churches and from time to time he has also played some of his smaller works for piano (with or without electronics) live at concerts. During the 2010 Vinterriss festival he was playing the live electronics part at the premiere of his piece "Ikke helt solo" ("not quite solo") for cello and quadrophonic live electronics.

Recordings
The music of Jon Mostad has been recorded by The norwegian Soloist's choir, The Oslo Philharmonic, Øystein Birkeland and Bergen Philharmonic Orchestra. His orchestral works "House", "The light shines in darkness" and "Concerto for cello and orchestra" were chosen by a jury of the Norwegian Society of Composers to be recorded on the Aurora label, resulting in the CD "The light shines in darkness" with Oslo Philharmonic, cellist Øystein Birkeland and conductor Michel Swierczewski.

Education
Theological candidate 1965. Music and pedagogy 1969. Diploma in composition at the Norwegian Academy of Music (ending in 1974). Main teacher: Finn Mortensen. An important inspiration during his studies were the private seminars in sonology and on Mahler by Olav Anton Thommessen. Shorter courses in studio work at NSEM, Høvikodden (1975/76), EMS Stockholm (1983).

Other activities
In addition to composing, Jon Mostad was teaching arrangement and composition, music and religion at high schools in Fredrikstad and Moss (years 10-12 or 11-13 in the Norwegian school system) until he retired in 2006. Among his many students were film director Harald Zwart and composer Frank Tveor Nordensten.

He has also been active in organisations such as Ny Musikk Østfold, the regional branch of an organisation promoting contemporary music, Norwegian Society of Composers and TONO.

Mostad is a devout Lutheran and has done volunteer work in Christian organisations such as being a Sunday school teacher, visiting prisoners, helping find funding and equipment for a hospital in Nigeria and delivering humanitarian aid to a village in Russia shortly after the fall of the Soviet bloc.

External links 
 Jon Mostad's official homepage
 Jon Mostad biography - Norwegian Music Information Centre
 UK premiere of "The Lord is my sheppard" from "2 psalms"
 Discography from Musikkonline & Norwegian Society of Composers
 Recording of Mostad's "2 psalms" with The Norwegian Soloist's choir

1942 births
20th-century classical composers
21st-century classical composers
Living people
Norwegian classical composers
Performing arts in Norway
Norwegian male classical composers
20th-century Norwegian male musicians
21st-century Norwegian male musicians
Musicians from Fredrikstad